HCW may refer to:
 Cheraw Municipal Airport,  South Carolina, US
 Former Hartford College for Women
 Health care worker
 Holby City woman, an informal UK voter demographic
 Hull–Chelsea–Wakefield Railway, Quebec, Canada